The Cursed Ones is a 2015 British film that was directed by Nana Obiri Yeboah and produced by Nicholas K. Lory. The original screenplay was written by Maximilian Claussen. The film tells the story of a disillusioned reporter and an idealistic young pastor, who fight to free a girl accused of witchcraft from the clutches of a corrupt system and superstition in the heart of West Africa.

The film received 3 African Movie Academy Awards in 2016 for Best Director, Best Cinematography, and Best Production Design. It was nominated for 13 AMAA awards in total, making it the most nominated film of 2016.

Cast

Oris Erhuero as Godwin Ezeudu
Jimmy Jean-Louis as Paladin
Ama K. Abebrese as Chinue
Joseph Otsiman as Pastor John Moses
Ophelia Dzidzornu as Asabi
Fred Amugi as Pastor Uchebo
David Dontoh as Bartender
Rama Brew as Village Elder
Akofa Edjeani Asiedu

Production
The film was shot entirely on location in Ghana. The majority of the film was shot in a single village in the Eastern Region of Ghana.

Release
The Cursed Ones screened at the Hackney Picturehouse in London, England as part of the official selection for the Royal African Society's Film Africa festival. In 2016 the film also screened in competition at the Pan African Film Festival in Los Angeles, the Atlanta Film Festival, the Helsinki African Film Festival, the 27th Annual Emden International Film Festival, and the New York African Film Festival at the Lincoln Center for the Performing Arts where it was co-presented by the Human Rights Watch.

Awards

References

External links 
 Zissou Pictures Official Film page
 The Cursed Ones at Rushlake Media
 
 Adventures of Sinbad actor, Oris Erhuero talks about shooting The Cursed Ones

2015 films
2015 thriller drama films
Films about witchcraft
Films about human rights
British films based on actual events
English-language Ghanaian films
Ghanaian independent films
Films about children
Films set in Nigeria
Films set in Ghana
Films set in Africa
Films shot in Ghana
British independent films
2015 drama films
2010s English-language films
2010s British films